Taxidermy is the stuffing and mounting of dead animals.

Taxidermy may also refer to:
Taxidermy (Queenadreena album), 2000
Taxidermy (Aပ္bney Park album), 2005
Taxidermy (Sharon Needles album), 2015, or the title song
"Taxidermy" (song), a song by White Lies

See also
Taxidermia, a 2006 Hungarian film
Taxonomy